Siegemund is a German surname. Notable people with the surname include:

Björn Siegemund (born 1973), German badminton player 
Justine Siegemund (1636–1705), German midwife and writer
Laura Siegemund (born 1988), German tennis player

German-language surnames